"Breakout" is the name of the first two episodes of the animated television series The Avengers: Earth's Mightiest Heroes. It was originally broadcast on Disney XD in the United States on October 20, 2010. Its broadcast was preceded by the release of a 20-episode online "micro-series" which introduced the individual heroes and set up the plot.

Plot

Part 1 
After Iron Man stops an arms trade between A.I.M. and Lucia von Bardas, he transports them to the Vault and returns to New York. In the Cube, Samson passes by the jails of Wrecker, Zzzax and Absorbing Man. Samson arrives in the holding cell of the Hulk who is in his pre-transformed state, Banner warns him that S.H.I.E.L.D. are going to use the villains as weapons. Samson tries to calm Banner, but he insists that the cube is dangerous. Thor watches over a city when he gets approached by Balder the Brave from Asgard. Balder tells Thor that his father before entering the Odin Sleep asked Thor to come back and protect Asgard. Thor rejects the offer, Balder doesn't understand and asks why he is so occupied to the city. Thor tells him that he is needed here so that he can make a difference unlike in Asgard who only solely relies on fighting. Below them, Jane Foster is taking care of some people who were involved in a traffic accident, while a speeding car bounces from the ground and is going straight to Jane but is deflected by Thor. Jane thanks Thor for saving her and is wondering if he is following her, Thor tells that he is intrigued by her since she doesn't seem to be scared even though she is a mortal. Meanwhile, Hank Pym talks with Mad Thinker to see what he meant when he referred to the villains in the super prisons as "soon being free". Also on board, Wasp declines Maria Hill's invitation to join S.H.I.E.L.D.

Bruce Banner warns Leonard Samson about SHIELD's ulterior motives for keeping him imprisoned. Meanwhile, Hawkeye sits silently in his cell at the Vault, after being framed by the double agent, Black Widow. Just then, all four super prisons' security systems shut down, allowing the combined 74 supervillains to escape. The tech-based foes in the Vault raided the armory getting their weapons until they are stopped by Hawkeye. Iron Man is alerted and immediately returns to the Vault.  Iron Man is outnumbered by old enemies at the Vault. To keep the villains from escaping, Tony self-destructs the Vault. The radiation-based villains of the Cube break loose, during which Samson is exposed to Gamma radiation when he is injured by Zzzax. Bruce transforms into the Hulk and escapes with Samson, heading for the nearest civilized area. The villains try to follow him, but the Leader orders them to remain. The prisoners of the Pym-particle shrunken Big House are freed and the prison itself grows back to normal size causing the Helicarrier it was kept in to crash into the Hudson River. Nick Fury learns of the other prisons' situations and realizes the same must be happening at the secret fourth prison, the Raft. It is at this moment, Graviton awakens. He lifts the prison into the sky, and confronts Fury, who now sees him as another supervillain, calling him "Graviton".

Part 2 
A flashback from 10 years ago reveals that Franklin Hall (Graviton) joined S.H.I.E.L.D, and was tasked by Nick Fury to recreate the "Super Soldier serum". However, the experimental reactor was pushed by Hall to critical levels and Fury ordered him to shut it down. Hall refused and was nearly killed when the reactor blew. Afterwards, he discovered while in recovery that he developed superpowers from the accident, unlimited levels of gravitational manipulation. Blaming Fury for the accident, Hall prepares to escape and wreak retribution on Fury. But SHIELD doses the room with gas, leaving Hall unconscious. He's then placed in high-level security within the underwater prison, the "Raft".

In the present, upon the deactivation of all the super-prisons, Hall awakens unaware of his surroundings and demands to know how long he's been incarcerated. Baron Zemo tells him he's been here longer than him, and Zemo has been here for 6 years. Enraged, Hall now seeks vengeance upon Fury for the years taken away from him. Graviton apparently destroys Fury but it is revealed to be a robot. Iron Man's armor was damaged and he radios for a replacement. Thor, Hank Pym, and Wasp fight Graviton. Graviton hurls Iron Man into space and lifts Long Island into the air then drops it, but Thor is able to slow its fall. Later, they are joined by Hulk and Iron Man. With their combined power they attacked Graviton but he uses his power to hold everybody on the ground. The Hulk fights against this and Ant-Man causes an ant to bite Graviton's neck, distracting him and freeing the heroes. The heroes unleash their most powerful attacks on Graviton and Wasp finishes him with a sting. They form The Avengers in order to catch the remaining 74 supervillains that escaped from the four prisons.

Broadcast 
"Breakout" was originally broadcast on Disney XD in the United States on October 20, 2010. "Part 1" originally aired on October 22, 2010 and "Part 2" originally aired on October 29, 2010 on Teletoon in Canada. Its broadcast was preceded by the release of a 20-episode online "micro-series" which introduced the individual heroes and set up the plot.

Critical reaction 
The Pilot episode was well received by fans and critics. Brian Lowry of Variety called The Avengers: Earth's Mightiest Heroes!, "a slick but dizzyingly busy Disney XD animated program. If not the creative equal of Cartoon Network's superhero team-up Justice League from rival DC Comics, the show unleashes enough action to be plenty mighty with boys and girls, as well as middle-aged adults with comics in Kevlar bags". Kofi Outlaw of Screen Rant called it "a fairly entertaining experience that should appeal to Marvel fans and cartoon fans alike, be they young or old. For all the positive things about it, however, Earth’s Mightiest Heroes still doesn’t quite reach the acclaimed status of DC Universe and their animated projects". Stephen Lackey of Mania.com stated, "Avengers: Earth’s Mightiest Heroes doesn’t compare to something like Justice League in animation or in story, but it is a step in the right direction for a Marvel animated product and it did end up being really entertaining". IGN called it "a really fun, action-packed show that should satisfy both new fans and Marvel geeks alike."

References 

2010 American television episodes
The Avengers: Earth's Mightiest Heroes episodes